Emarginula costulata is a species of sea snail, a marine gastropod mollusk in the family Fissurellidae, the keyhole limpets.

Description
The shell measures 5.5 mm.

Distribution
This marine species occurs in the Indian Ocean off Réunion

References

 Herbert D.G. (1987) Taxonomic studies on the Emarginulinae (Mollusca: Gastropoda: Fissurellidae) of southern Africa and Mozambique. Hemitoma, Clypidina, Tugali, Scutus, Zeidora and two species of Emarginula. South African Journal of Zoology 
 Drivas, J.; Jay, M. (1987). Coquillages de La Réunion et de l'Île Maurice. Collection Les Beautés de la Nature. Delachaux et Niestlé: Neuchâtel. . 159 pp.

External links
 Deshayes G.P. (1863). Catalogue des mollusques de l'île de la Réunion (Bourbon). Pp. 1-144. In Maillard, L. (Ed.) Notes sur l'Ile de la Réunion. Dentu, Paris
 Herbert D.G. (2015). An annotated catalogue and bibliography of the taxonomy, synonymy and distribution of the Recent Vetigastropoda of South Africa (Mollusca). Zootaxa. 4049(1): 1-98

Fissurellidae
Gastropods described in 1863